Araik Krist real name Arayik Ishkhanyan (born November 3, 1986, Kirovakan, Armenia) - stylist, singer, artist, presenter, blogger, mentor of the Arayik Krist beauty school. Multiple winner of hairdressing competitions, winner of the All-Russian competition "Battle of Salons" on the channel "Friday", an international judge in hairdressing, author and host of the program "100 with Araik Krist"  on the Rostov Papa TV channel.

Biography 

Born in the city of Kirovakan, Republic of Armenia .

Mother - Matsakyan Narine Kolyaevna - born on August 29, 1966, an accountant by profession.

Father - Ishkhanyan Armen Stanikovich - born on December 19, 1964, profession shoemaker.

In 1993, after the divorce of his parents, little Araik moved to Russia with his mother and sister. Subsequently, the whole family moves to Russia.

2004 - 2006 - Army. Federal Service of the Russian Federation in the Republic of Aramenia, border troops.

Career 

2002 - 2004 - worked as a hairdresser in the salon "Belir".
After the army in 2006, he returned to the same salon, where he worked until 2009 .

In 2008, Araik Krist gets to study with the famous Russian stylist Sergey Zverev.

For some time he worked in Moscow in various beauty houses, was invited to work as a stylist in the Fashion House of fashion designer Zaitsev.

In 2011, Araik Krist opens his own salon in the city of Rostov-on-Don, and also begins filming his own program "One hundred percent." In 2018, the network already consists of 4 salons.

Further, Araik Krist participates in various hairdressing competitions, in which he takes first prizes, creates his own label "Araik Krist" and forms his own beauty house "Araik Krist house of beauty".

Actively cooperates with various brands.

In 2015, the beauty house "Araik Krist house of beauty" participates in the show "Battle of salons" with Zhanna Badoeva, in which it takes first place.

In 2018, he opens his own hairdressing school where he issues state diplomas.

Also, Araik Krist is actively filming in various projects on television, participating in various shows, including Evening Urgant and Andrey Malakhov's talk show Let They Talk.

He shoots his own video for the song "This is such a party"
Hits Artist
"This is such a party"
"I'm not like others"
"Bride"
"Dance like Araik" 

Personal life: in 2022, he was married to Nana Krist. Currently, the spouse works together with Arayik
Araik is actively involved in charity work in various areas.

References